Barcaldine Castle (also called the Black Castle) is a 17th-century tower house castle located at Barcaldine 9 miles north of Oban, Scotland.

History 
The castle was built by Duncan Campbell of Glenorchy between 1601 and 1609. In 1692, the castle was attacked during the massacre of Glencoe.

The castle fell into disrepair in the later 19th century, when Barcaldine House became the principal residence of the family. It was restored between 1897 and 1911. It was purchased in November 2009 by David Whitehead.

Description 
The castle has a bottle dungeon and two hidden passageways.

The castle offers a view of the Loch Creran and the Glen Coe mountains.

The castle has been owned since November 2009 by David Whitehead.

Ghost
The ghost of Sir Duncan Campbell is said to have been spotted roaming Barcaldine, searching for the man who murdered him.

Citations

External links
Barcaldine Castle bed & breakfast website

Castles in Argyll and Bute
Category A listed buildings in Argyll and Bute
Reportedly haunted locations in Scotland
Hotels in Argyll and Bute
Tower houses in Scotland